The Phillips County Penal Farm Historic District encompasses a former prison facility in Phillips County, Arkansas.  It is located on the east side of County Road 353, south of United States Route 49, about halfway between Helena-West Helena and Marvell.  The complex consists of three concrete structures, a water tower, and a concrete foundation pad.  The main building is a cast concrete structure, two stories in height, with Plain Tradition and International styling, while the other two buildings are single-story concrete block structures.  These, and the water tower, were built c. 1935–37 with funding from the Works Progress Administration, and served as a penal facility until 1973.  The property is now vacant and abandoned.

The complex was listed on the National Register of Historic Places in 2007.

See also
National Register of Historic Places listings in Phillips County, Arkansas

References

Government buildings on the National Register of Historic Places in Arkansas
International style architecture in Arkansas
Buildings and structures completed in 1937
Buildings and structures in Phillips County, Arkansas
Historic districts on the National Register of Historic Places in Arkansas
National Register of Historic Places in Phillips County, Arkansas